Fructose-1,6-bisphosphatase 1 is a protein that in humans is encoded by the FBP1 gene.

Function 

Fructose-1,6-bisphosphatase 1, a gluconeogenesis regulatory enzyme, catalyzes the hydrolysis of fructose 1,6-bisphosphate to fructose 6-phosphate and inorganic phosphate. Fructose-1,6-diphosphatase deficiency is associated with hypoglycemia and metabolic acidosis.

References

Further reading 

 
 
 
 
 
 
 
 
 

Human proteins